Elisabeth Höngen (7 December 1906 – 7 August 1997) was a German operatic mezzo-soprano and singing-actress. She was particularly associated with Richard Wagner and Richard Strauss roles, and with Verdi's Lady Macbeth. From 1947 onward she was one of the Vienna State Opera's most prominent artists for nearly 30 years.

Career
Höngen was born in Gevelsberg, Germany. She publicly performed as a violinist at age 15.

She studied German and music at the University of Berlin and the Berlin State School of Music. Her voice teacher was Hermann Weißenborn in Berlin, the same teacher who trained Marga Höffgen's voice 15 years later. In 1933, Höngen made her debut at the Stadttheater Wuppertal. From 1935–1940 she sang at the Düsseldorf Opera including two guest performances in the Netherlands in 1934 and 1938. In 1937, she participated in the premiere of the opera Magnus Fahlander by Fritz von Borries. From 1940 until 1943 she was a member of the Dresden opera. In 1943, she was invited to the Vienna State Opera where she stayed until her retirement.

In 1947 and 1959–60 Höngen performed at La Scala in Milano, the Covent Garden Opera House in London, the Teatro Colón in Buenos Aires, the Grand Opéra in Paris, in Amsterdam, Zürich, Berlin und Munich. From 1951–52 she worked at the Metropolitan Opera in New York. She sang at the Edinburgh Festival, and performed the Fricka und Waltraute in Richard Wagner's Nibelungenring at the Bayreuther Festspiele in 1951, as well as the Maggio Musicale Fiorentino in Florence.

In 1957, she accepted a position as a professor at the Wiener Musikakademie while at the same time continuing her stage career. In 1965, she performed in Vienna, and at the Salzburger Festspiele. She left the Vienna State Opera in 1971.

Höngen died in Vienna in August 1997 at the age of 91.

Performances and roles
Höngen appeared at the Salzburg Festival and the Bayreuth Festival, quickly establishing herself in roles such as Venus, Ortrud, Fricka, Erda, Waltraute, Herodias, Klytemnestra, Die Amme, and Clairon. She won considerable acclaim as Lady Macbeth, Eboli, Amneris, and Carmen. She sang the title role in Britten's The Rape of Lucretia, and Baba the Turk in Stravinsky's The Rake's Progress.

She made guest appearances at the Munich State Opera, the Royal Opera House in London, the Paris Opéra, La Scala in Milan, the Teatro Colón in Buenos Aires, and the Metropolitan Opera in New York.

Recognition
Conductor Karl Böhm called her "the world's greatest tragedienne".

In 1964 she was awarded the Mozartmedaille by the Mozart community of Vienna.

Her voice has been described as "rich, beautifully formed, with dramatic delivery and strength and feeling for style exciting admiration" ("Umfangreiche, schön gebildete Stimme, deren dramatische Ausdruckskraft und deren Stilgefühl Bewunderung erregten").

Recordings 
 1943 – Macbeth – Mathieu Ahlersmeyer, Elisabeth Hongen, Josef Witt, Herbert Alsen – Vienna State Opera Chorus and Orchestra, Karl Böhm – Cantus Classic (sung in German)
 1954 – Johannes Brahms, Alto Rhapsody, Ferdinand Leitner conducting the Berlin Philharmonic Orchestra  (DGG 16105 LP)
 HMV-Electrola (9th Symphony by L.v. Beethoven), Philips 
 DGG (Elektra, Lied cycle Frauenliebe und –leben by R. Schumann) 
 Columbia (Lieder), Seraphim (Hänsel und Gretel), UORC (Frau ohne Schatten by R. Strauss) 
 Urania (Macbeth by Verdi) 
 Decca (Frau ohne Schatten) 
 Bruno Walter Society (complete Der Ring des Nibelungen) 
 Murray Hill (Erda in Siegfried, Fricka in Rheingold and Walküre), (Marcellina in Le Nozze di Figaro), 
 Cetra Opera Live (Aida) 
 Rococo (Elektra in the role of Klytämnestra) 
 Melodram (F minor Mass by Bruckner, Verdi’s Requiem)

Further reading

E. Wurm: ‘Elizabeth Höngen. An artist picture’ Vienna, 1966.
Biography by Erik Eriksson, allmusic.com, n.d.

References

1906 births
1997 deaths
20th-century German women opera singers
People from Ennepe-Ruhr-Kreis
German operatic mezzo-sopranos
Humboldt University of Berlin alumni
Academic staff of the University of Music and Performing Arts Vienna